State Route 201 (SR 201) is a state highway in the U.S. state of California that serves Fresno and Tulare counties in the Central Valley. It connects State Route 99 in Kingsburg with State Route 245 at Elderwood. State Route 201 forms a short concurrency with State Route 63 near Calgro.

Route description
The route begins at State Route 99 in Kingsburg, Fresno County with an interchange. It then exits the county and enters Tulare County, where it meets County Route J31 and County Route J19. It then meets State Route 63 for a short concurrency. Upon leaving, it intersects County Route J15 and County Route J23 before meeting its east end at State Route 245 in Elderwood.

SR 201 is not part of the National Highway System, a network of highways that are considered essential to the country's economy, defense, and mobility by the Federal Highway Administration.

Major intersections

See also

References

External links

California @ AARoads.com - State Route 201
Caltrans: Route 201 highway conditions
California Highways: SR 201

201
State Route 201
State Route 201